Sir Charles Stewart Scott,  (17 March 1838 – 26 April 1924) was a British diplomat.

Scott was educated at Cheltenham College. He started his career as attaché at Paris (1859); transferred to  Dresden (1859) and Copenhagen (1862); promoted to be a 3rd secretary at Copenhagen (1863); transferred to Madrid (1865) and Berne (1866); promoted to be a 2nd secretary at Mexico (1866); transferred to Lisbon (1868), Stuttgart (1871), Munich (1872), Vienna (1873), St Petersburg (1874), and Darmstadt (1877); secretary of legation at Coburg (1879); from 1877 to 1883 repeatedly acting chargé d'affaires at Darmstadt and in 1881 at Stuttgart; promoted to be a secretary of embassy at Berlin (1883-1893); promoted to be envoy extraordinary and minister plenipotentiary to the Swiss Confederation; transferred to Copenhagen (1893-1898); from 1898 to 1904 he was British ambassador to Imperial Russia.

In the 1899 Birthday Honours, Scott was appointed Knight Grand Cross of the Order of the Bath (GCB).

See also
List of Ambassadors from the United Kingdom to Russia

References

Ambassadors of the United Kingdom to Russia
People educated at Cheltenham College
Ambassadors of the United Kingdom to Switzerland
Ambassadors of the United Kingdom to Denmark
Knights Grand Cross of the Order of the Bath
Knights Grand Cross of the Order of St Michael and St George
Members of the Privy Council of the United Kingdom
1838 births
1924 deaths
Alumni of Trinity College Dublin